Surprise is a populated place in Greene County, New York,  United States. In 2014, the population was 419.

History
A post office called Surprise was established in 1889, and remained in operation until it was discontinued in 1988. Surprise has been noted for its unusual place name.

References

Hamlets in Greene County, New York